Superfast Ferries is a Greece-based ferry company founded in 1993 by Pericles Panagopulos and Alexander Panagopulos. Superfast Ferries is a member of Attica Group and operates 3 car-passenger ferries, offering daily connections between Ancona and Bari (Italy) and Patras and Igoumenitsa (Greece). Together with Blue Star Ferries, Africa Morocco Link and Hellenic Seaways it is a subsidiary company of Attica Group, which is listed on the Athens Stock Exchange.

Routes
In the past Superfast Ferries has operated lines in several parts of Europe, on the Adriatic Sea, Aegean Sea, North Sea, and the Baltic sea. Currently, they are mainly active in the Adriatic sea, operating between Greece and Italy.  Their routes are between the Italian ports of Ancona and Bari and the Greek ports of Igoumenitsa and Patras, as well as between Bari and Corfu.

Superfast operated the Rosyth - Zeebrugge ferry service between 2002 and 2008. On 29 May 2008 it was announced that Superfast Ferries would withdraw across the North Sea. The service was subsequently withdrawn on 13 September 2008. The North Sea service was mainland Scotland's only year round, direct, scheduled ferry service to and from Continental Europe. The vessel used was Blue Star 1, which replaced the larger Superfast X on the route. Blue Star 1 has been reallocated to Attica's Mediterranean services. Norfolkline restarted the route in May 2009.

Superfast also operated between Piraeus and Heraklion until 2013. On 8 March 2013 it was announced that Superfast VI has been sold to Genting Group and Superfast XII, which was operating that route, was transferred to its position in Adriatic Sea.

Superfast had proposed and was the favourite to run a new ferry service between Great Yarmouth, United Kingdom and IJmuiden, Netherlands in 2004 at the new Great Yarmouth Outer Harbour development after a bidding process held in 2002. Superfast never went ahead with the route.

Vessel allocations
In late 2005, Superfast ferries removed one of the two ships operating the link between Zeebrugge and Rosyth, thus turning the daily link from Belgium to Scotland into one operated only every other day. Superfast IX joined the two ship operation between Hanko and Rostock to serve the growing demand in the Finland - Germany service.

In addition, Superfast introduced a new "roll-on roll-off" (RoRo) service between Uusikaupunki and Rostock in January 2005. Attica has since moved one of the RO/RO ships RORO MARIN to their Adriatic Sea routes.

In April 2006, Superfast and Attica once more took the market by surprise by agreeing to sell the Superfast VII, Superfast VIII and Superfast IX ice-class ferries to Estonian operator Tallink for €310 million.

In August 2006 Attica entered into an agreement to sell to Veolia Transport its ice-class vessel Superfast X trading between Scotland and Belgium for € 112mln. The delivery of Superfast X took place in January 2007.

In September 2007, Pericles Panagopulos, the former key shareholder of Attica and then Chairman, sold his family's participation for € 5.50 per share to Marfin Investment Group. The move was seen as a "family transition" decision and was interpreted to be an exit for the then 72-year-old investor. Alexander Panagopulos, CEO of Attica, resigned prior to this sale and founded his shipping company by the name Arista Shipping S.A..

ANEK-Superfast
On 8 June 2011 Superfast Ferries and ANEK Lines create a joint venture in Piraeus-Heraklion and Patras-Igoumenitsa-Ancona routes with two RO-PAX ships in the first one (the ANEK-owned "Olympic Champion" and the Superfast-owned "Superfast XII") and three in the second one (the ANEK-owned "Hellenic Spirit" and the Superfast-owned "Superfast VI" and "Superfast XI").

Controversy
On January 18, 2023, Lighthouse Reports, in collaboration with SRF, ARD, Al Jazeera, Il Domani and Solomon published a report claiming illegal pushbacks of asylum seekers from Italy to Greece using Superfast ferries. If those asylum seekers arrived to the ports of Venice, Ancona, Bari and Brindisi, they were denied the opportunity to seek asylum and were pushed back using the Superfast ships. Immigrants were put into shower rooms and metal boxes with caged roofs, sometimes being handcuffed to metal shelves.

Current Fleet

Past fleet

References

Further reading

External links

Superfast Ferries - Online Ferry Ticket Sales and Reservations.
Attica Group - Parent Company of Superfast Ferries.
Superfast ferries - Online Ferry tickets reservations & Superfast ferries Related info.

Ferry companies of Greece
Companies based in Athens